Le Bouveret is a village in the commune of Port-Valais in the Swiss canton of Valais. Situated at the southernmost end of Lake Geneva and close to the French border, Le Bouveret is very much tourism-oriented with several amusement attractions, including the Swiss Vapeur Parc and the water amusement park Aquaparc. Le Bouveret is also the seat of Cesar Ritz Colleges, a Hospitality school.

Access
By bus, from the Aigle train station.
By train, from the Saint-Maurice station.
From Motorway A9 (Brigue - Lausanne - Vallorbe), exit 16 (Villeneuve) or 17 (Aigle)
By boat from Lake Geneva.

Villages in Valais
Populated places on Lake Geneva